The Sanctuary of Nuestra Señora de los Remedios (Spanish: Santuario de Nuestra Señora de los Remedios) is a sanctuary located in Fuensanta, Spain. It was declared Bien de Interés Cultural in 1973.

References 

Churches in Castilla–La Mancha
Bien de Interés Cultural landmarks in the Province of Albacete